Harry Salt (20 November 1899 – 1971) was an English professional footballer who played in the Football League for Brighton & Hove Albion, Queens Park Rangers, Crystal Palace, Brentford and Walsall.

Career
Salt played for Brighton & Hove Albion, Mexborough Town, Peterborough & Fletton United, Queens Park Rangers, Grays Thurrock, Crystal Palace and then Brentford. Salt made 84 appearances for the "Bees" between 1929 and 1932, helping the club to finish second in the Third Division South in 1929–30. He later played for Walsall, Yeovil & Petters United and Tunbridge Wells Rangers.

References

1899 births
1971 deaths
Footballers from Sheffield
English footballers
Association football wing halves
Association football outside forwards
Ecclesfield United F.C. players
Brighton & Hove Albion F.C. players
Mexborough Athletic F.C. players
Peterborough & Fletton United F.C. players
Queens Park Rangers F.C. players
Grays Thurrock United F.C. players
Crystal Palace F.C. players
Brentford F.C. players
Walsall F.C. players
Yeovil Town F.C. players
Tunbridge Wells F.C. players
Southern Football League players
English Football League players